Antarctic Journal is a 2005 South Korean film.  It is the feature film debut by director Yim Pil-sung. The film mixes elements of psychological thriller and classical horror films while showing the hardships met by a modern Korean antarctic expedition trying to reach the pole of inaccessibility. The film generated some buzz before its release due to its large budget (over ) and notable cast, but wasn't a box office hit.

Plot

During their journey to the Pole of Inaccessibility (POI), the remotest point of the Antarctic, the expedition of six men, led by Captain Choi Do-hyung, discovers a journal that was left behind by a British expedition 80 years earlier. The journal was remarkably preserved in a box in the snow and Kim Min-jae, another member of the expedition, gets the job of examining it. It turns out that the two expeditions shared the same goal and soon other strange similarities between them start to show up. Will they make it to their destination before the sun goes down for the Antarctic winter?

Cast
 Song Kang-ho - Choi Do-hyung
 Yoo Ji-tae - Kim Min-jae
 Choi Deok-moon - Seo Jae-kyung
 Kim Kyeong-ik - Yang Geun-chan
 Park Hee-soon - Lee Young-min
 Yoon Je-moon - Sung-hoon
 Kang Hye-jung - Yoo-jin
 Sam Hammington - English expedition party (voice)
 Oh Hee-joon as Person

Reception

Derek Elley from Variety wrote, "Some awesome widescreen lensing, with New Zealand convincingly repping the polar wastes, can't compensate for the dramatic emptiness of Antarctic Journal, in which the script gets lost along with the explorers."

See also
 List of Korean-language films
 Cinema of Korea
 K-Horror
 Contemporary culture of South Korea

References

External links 
 
 
 
 Kyu Hyun Kim's review at Koreanfilm.org

2005 films
2000s adventure drama films
South Korean adventure drama films
South Korean thriller drama films
South Korean mystery thriller films
Films set in Antarctica
Films shot in New Zealand
Films directed by Yim Pil-sung
Films with screenplays by Bong Joon-ho
2000s Korean-language films
2005 thriller drama films
2000s mystery thriller films
Showbox films
2005 directorial debut films
2000s South Korean films